Chekkanurani is a neighbourhood in Madurai district of Tamil Nadu state in the peninsular India.

Chekkanurani has a Higher Secondary School viz., Keren Public School, from class Pre-KG to std. XII with 1,300 students totally.Also, a Government Polytechnic College, run by State Government of Tamil Nadu, is situated in Chekkanurani. 

During the surface excavation of earth, in the month of December 2022, near Chekkanurani, a carved sculpture of Kottravai (old deity goddess) was found, which is assumed to be 1200 years old.

References 

Neighbourhoods and suburbs of Madurai